Advance Transit is the main public transportation provider for eastern Windsor County and southwestern Grafton County in southeastern Vermont and western New Hampshire, respectively. Local bus routes are provided between the Dartmouth-Hitchcock Medical Center, Dartmouth College, the city of Lebanon, New Hampshire, and the towns of Hanover, New Hampshire, and Hartford, Vermont, including the unincorporated village of White River Junction.

Advance Transit was created in 1981 following the failure of the for-profit Tri-Town Bus Company. In 1977 the Upper Valley Lake Sunapee Council (now the Upper Valley Lake Sunapee Regional Planning Commission) completed a Transit Development Plan for a non-profit public transportation system covering a larger service area. The Plan was endorsed by the State of New Hampshire, and Advance Transit was then formed as a program of the Upper Valley Senior Citizens Council. In 1984 Advance Transit incorporated as a separate non-profit entity.

The Green, Orange and Brown routes had a combined ridership of 66,400 in fiscal year 2010. There are seven wheelchair-accessible buses with bike racks in the company's fleet on the routes on the Vermont side.

All routes are fare free and run on weekdays only. Trip planning via Advance Transit is also available on Google Maps.

Route list
(Information is current as of May 30, 2014)

Blue Line
Red Line
Orange Line
Green Line
Brown Line
Dartmouth-Hanover Shuttle
DHMC Shuttles

References

External links
 Advance Transit website
 Advance Transit Facebook
 Advance Transit Instagram
 Advance Transit LinkedIn

Bus transportation in Vermont
Bus transportation in New Hampshire